Ikakogi is a genus of frogs in the family Centrolenidae. It has been tentatively placed in the subfamily Centroleninae, although more recent analyses suggest that it is the sister group of the clade Centroleninae+Hyalinobatrachiinae.

Taxonomy
Until 2019, the genus was considered to be monotypic, but now contains the following two species:
 Ikakogi ispacue Rada, Dias, Peréz-González, Anganoy-Criollo, Rueda-Solano, Pinto-E., Mejía Quintero, Vargas-Salinas, and Grant, 2019
 Ikakogi tayrona (Ruiz-Carranza and Lynch, 1991)

References

Glass frogs
Amphibians of South America
Amphibians of Colombia
Endemic fauna of Colombia
Amphibian genera